The Ford Mack Avenue Plant, a rented wagon manufacturing shop in Detroit, Michigan, was the first facility used by the Ford Motor Company to assemble automobiles. Henry Ford began to occupy it in April 1903 in preparation for the company's incorporation, which occurred on June 16, 1903. Production of the original Ford Model A began that same month after the incorporation. Soon after, the building was expanded and a second story was added to increase production. The Model A was followed by the Model AC, which was a Model A with the larger Ford Model C engine. Most of the major car components were manufactured by outside companies, including the "running gear" (the chassis, engine, transmission, drive shaft, and axles), which was supplied by the Dodge Brothers Company. A total of 1,708 cars (670 Model A's and 1,038 Model AC's) were assembled at the Mack Avenue Plant. The company occupied the building until October 1904, when its manufacturing operations were moved to the Ford Piquette Avenue Plant in Detroit, where the Ford Model T would later be built.

The Mack Avenue Plant's address was originally 588–592 Mack Avenue when Ford Motor Company occupied the building. Its address became 6520 Mack Avenue after the city of Detroit changed its street numbering system in January 1921. The building burned down in August 1941. A replica of the Mack Avenue Plant, one-fourth the size of the original, was built in 1945 at Greenfield Village, an open-air museum in Dearborn, Michigan.

See also
List of Ford factories

References

Ford factories
Former motor vehicle assembly plants
Industrial buildings and structures in Detroit
Motor vehicle assembly plants in Michigan